Ivan Šimonović (born 2 May 1959) is a Croatian diplomat, politician and law scholar. In October 2008 he was appointed Justice Minister of Croatia. On 3 May 2010, Šimonović was appointed UN Assistant Secretary-General for Human Rights.

Education and career
Šimonović graduated from the University of Zagreb Law School in 1982. He obtained a doctoral degree in 1990, at the age of 31. Šimonović joined the Croatian diplomatic corps after the break-up of Yugoslavia. He was an assistant to Foreign Minister Mate Granić during the 1990s, although he never joined the ruling party, the Croatian Democratic Union (HDZ).

In 1997, Croatian President Franjo Tuđman named him ambassador to the United Nations. Šimonović served there until 2002. While serving there, Šimonović presided over the United Nations Economic and Social Council.

In 2002, Šimonovic was named Deputy Foreign Minister in Ivica Račan's government. He remained independent and did not join the ruling SDP. When the HDZ swung back to power in 2003, Šimonović was not offered a job in the new government. In 2004, he became a professor at the University of Zagreb Law School, where he teaches general theory of law and state and international relations.

Šimonović was appointed Minister of Justice-designate of Croatia by PM Ivo Sanader on 6 October 2008. His predecessor, Ana Lovrin, had resigned the same day following a series of unsolved assaults and murders linked to Croatian organized crime that culminated with the murder of Ivana Hodak, daughter of controversial Croatian lawyer Zvonimir Hodak. However, it turned out that she was killed by a homeless man, in some apparent act of retaliation against her father.

In May 2010 Šimonović was appointed by the United Nations Secretary-General Ban Ki-moon as the Assistant Secretary-General for Human Rights.

References

External links
Personal data at OHCHR portal

1959 births
Living people
Members of the European Commission against Racism and Intolerance
Politicians from Zagreb
Croatian diplomats
Croatian educators
Faculty of Law, University of Zagreb alumni
Croatian officials of the United Nations
Academic staff of the University of Zagreb
Permanent Representatives of Croatia to the United Nations
Justice ministers of Croatia
Fulbright alumni